Olzai is a comune (municipality) in the Province of Nuoro in the Italian region Sardinia, located about  north of Cagliari and about  southwest of Nuoro.

Olzai borders the following municipalities: Austis, Nughedu Santa Vittoria, Ollolai, Ottana, Sarule, Sedilo, Sorradile, Teti.

References

Cities and towns in Sardinia